WFMZ-TV (channel 69) is an independent television station in Allentown, Pennsylvania.

Locally-based Maranatha Broadcasting Company owns the station and Wilmington, Delaware–licensed MeTV affiliate WDPN-TV. Both stations share studios on East Rock Road on South Mountain in Allentown, where WFMZ-TV's transmitter is located. WFMZ-TV also maintains a secondary studio in the PPL Center sports arena in Center City Allentown and a newsroom on Court Street in Reading.

Broadcast area
WFMZ mainly serves the Lehigh Valley region (including Warren County, New Jersey in the New York City market) and Berks County. Because the Lehigh Valley is part of the Philadelphia television market, it also has significant cable reach into much of the Philadelphia area, including Trenton. The station's over-the-air signal reaches some counties in northwestern New Jersey that are part of the New York City market and is carried on some New York City-area cable networks.

History

Channel 67

Prior to the debut of channel 69, an earlier television station that held the WFMZ-TV call sign and was based in Allentown operated on UHF channel 67 from December 1954 until April 1955. Like the current WFMZ-TV, it was co-owned with WFMZ radio (100.7 MHz). The radio station was sold twice in the 21-year gap between the two television stations.

Channel 69
In February 1975, WFMZ reapplied for a television station license with channel 69 having been substituted for channel 67 in Allentown. The application was approved on December 9, 1975. Studios and a transmitter were co-sited with WFMZ radio. Much of the equipment, including a transmitter from a recently failed station on channel 69, was used by WHFV in Fredericksburg, Virginia.

WFMZ-TV made its debut on November 25, 1976. Its programming consisted primarily of family-oriented entertainment shows, operating 13 hours a day. The FM radio station remained co-owned until it was sold in 1997.

In the 1990s, WFMZ began running fewer religious shows and more sitcoms, talk shows and reality shows. The station's news division, 69 News, also gradually expanded. By 2000, the station was running three hours of local Lehigh Valley news a day and a mix of comedy shows and talk, reality television, and court show programming. The station presently airs about six hours a day of news in addition to talk and reality shows.

Local programming

News
In 1976, the station's news department debuted with two daily newscasts at 7pm and 10 pm daily. The news programs were later branded as Channel 69 News in the late 1980s and the station's news division was expanded. In 1989, WFMZ added a 5pm newscast and the 7pm news program was moved up to 6pm.

In 1995, WFMZ expanded its news service geographically with the debut of its Berks Edition newscast at 5:30 p.m. In 1998, this program was expanded to include a 10:30 p.m news broadcast. Both Berks Edition newscasts were established in response to a perception that the Allentown area was being covered more extensively than the Reading area by Philadelphia news stations. WFMZ originally used a small newsroom at the Reading Eagle newspaper for these broadcasts.

Beginning in 1997, WFMZ began experiencing significantly enhanced ratings for its news coverage of the Lehigh Valley. In the late 1990s, the station also launched its first Lehigh Valley-focused morning and noon news programs.

In 2003, the region's first Spanish language newscast, 69 News en Español, debuted to serve the growing Hispanic community in the Lehigh Valley and Berks County areas.

In 2005, WFMZ formed a broadcast partnership with WPVI Channel 6, Philadelphia's ABC affiliate. The partnership permitted the two stations to cooperate in news gathering for local stories. In November 2017, WFMZ launched newly formatted and expanded newscasts. In May 2008, WFMZ became the fourth television station in the Philadelphia media market to begin broadcasting its local newscasts in high definition.

In October 2014, WFMZ added an hour-long newscast at 4:00pm, making it the third station in the Philadelphia market (after WCAU Channel 10 and WPVI-TV Channel 6) to broadcast local news in the 4pm timeslot. In February 2015, WFMZ debuted its new street-level studio inside the PPL Center sports arena in center city Allentown. The station broadcasts its noon news program from the PPL Center studio.

Non-news programming
WFMZ produces local programs about business, sports and health-related topics, including:
The American Law Journal is a call-in show that debuted in 1990, hosted by attorney Christopher Naughton, who is joined by various attorneys to answer questions about legal topics. 
Animal Doctor is hosted by 6pm weather anchor Kathy Craine and features Lehigh Valley veterinarians discussing pet-related topics.
The Big Ticket covers Lehigh Valley high school football highlights and airs every Friday at 11pm in place of the Spanish-language Edición en Español newscast, which airs at 6:30pm on WFMZ-DT4 during the high school football season. The show debuted in 1995 and is hosted by Jim Vaughn and Dan Moscaritolo with reports from WFMZ sports reporter Dave Lesko.
Business Matters is a discussion program, hosted by Tony Iannelli, that features a panel of experts discussing various business issues.
The Freddy Awards, modeled after the Tony Awards ceremony,  debuted on WFMZ in 2003 and features a panel of evaluators who view and judge Lehigh Valley high school musical productions. The best of these high school productions are recognized in an annual ceremony broadcast live on WFMZ. Ed Hanna and Shelley Brown host the ceremony from the State Theatre in Easton.
Lehigh Sports Magazine is a sports program on Lehigh University sports that debuted in 1994 and airs during the fall. It is hosted by Jim Vaughn and features interviews with Lehigh University coaches and players.
Talk With Your Doctor is a call-in show featuring health-related issues. The show is hosted by Doug Eberhart, who is joined by a panel of physicians from St. Luke's University Health Network.
The Peak features new medical innovations, nutritious recipes and related events. The show debuted September 30, 2012, and is hosted by Ashley Russo and Mike Mittman.
WFMZ Documentary Unit is a partnership between WFMZ and Julian Farris Films to create documentaries on local Lehigh Valley events and people. The documentary unit has won Emmy nominations for several of its documentaries, including Boscov: An American Story, Time Bomb: Allentown Gas Explosion, and Aftershocks: Earthquake in Haiti. The documentary unit is headed up by 69 News reporter Jaccii Farris and includes WFMZ executive producer Amy Unger, both of whom also maintain affiliations with Julian Farris Films.

Technical information

Subchannels

WFMZ offers three subchannels on a multiplex shared with WBPH-TV, WLVT-TV, and WPPT. One is the 69 News Weather Channel, a continuous loop of regional weather information, traffic cameras, and news headlines. 69 News Weather Channel launched February 5, 2001, and is the first such multicast service in the United States. Another subchannel offers a simulcast of WDPN-TV's MeTV channel.

Translators
The WBPH-WFMZ-WLVT-WPPT multiplex is broadcast on a digital replacement translator that improve reception in areas to the south of Allentown, including Philadelphia:

A second digital replacement translator in Boyertown on UHF channel 27 is no longer active. A third digital replacement translator for WFMZ-TV on UHF channel 24 in Allentown (WFMZ-AB), which is no longer active, and W24CS-D in Reading offers a different mix of channels with two additional subchannels from WDPN-TV.

In 2009, WFMZ began carrying Retro TV as a WFMZ subchannel. On January 24, 2014, however, MeTV announced that it would move its Philadelphia-market affiliation from WFMZ-TV's 69.3 subchannel to KJWP (channel 2), which has carried MeTV programming in addition to the WFMZ subchannel since November 2013. In April 2014, Atlanta-based Tuff TV officially replaced MeTV on the 69.3 subchannel; in December 2014, the signal began carrying the Heroes & Icons network feed. On October 1, 2019, WFMZ re-added MeTV as a simulcast of WDPN-TV on the 69.3 subchannel; H&I is still seen in the market on WDPN's fourth subchannel.

Analog-to-digital conversion
WFMZ-TV shut down its analog signal over UHF channel 69 on June 12, 2009, the official date in which full-power television stations in the United States transitioned from analog to digital broadcasts under federal regulations. WFMZ's digital signal continued broadcasting its pre-transition UHF channel 46. Through the use of PSIP, digital television receivers display the station's virtual channel as its former UHF analog channel 69, which was among the high band UHF channels (52-69) that were removed from broadcasting use as a result of the transition.

WFMZ's standalone signal was sold in the 2017 broadcast spectrum auction. It entered into a channel-sharing agreement with WBPH-TV. To relieve any congestion related to the channel sharing, some of WFMZ's subchannels moved to KJWP, which WFMZ purchased in a separate transaction with the proceeds from the spectrum sale.

Alternate distribution 
In New Jersey, WFMZ is carried on basic cable in Phillipsburg and Milford, which are both part of the New York City media market. WFMZ is carried on cable providers in Schuylkill County, including Tamaqua, Pottsville, and the surrounding areas of Carbon County, Monroe County, and Luzerne County, each of which is located in the Scranton/Wilkes-Barre media market. In northwestern New Jersey, WFMZ is also available on digital cable on Xfinity's Port Murray system alongside Philadelphia-based affiliates KYW Channel 3 (CBS), Fox Broadcasting's WTXF (Fox), and WCAU (NBC).

See also
Media in the Lehigh Valley

References

External links

Independent television stations in the United States
Retro TV affiliates
FMZ-TV
Television channels and stations established in 1976
Mass media in Allentown, Pennsylvania
FMZ-TV
1976 establishments in Pennsylvania